The 2017 South American Aerobic Gymnastics Championships were held in Lima, Peru, August 23–25, 2017. The competition was organized by the Peruvian Gymnastics Federation and approved by the International Gymnastics Federation.

Medalists

References

2017 in gymnastics
International gymnastics competitions hosted by Peru
2017 in Peruvian sport
South American Gymnastics Championships